Kehar Singh Rawat is an Indian politician. He was elected to the Haryana Legislative Assembly from Hathin in the 2014 as a member of the Indian National Lok Dal.

In 2019, he resigned as MLA and from Haryana Legislative Assembly and joined Bharatiya Janata Party.

References 

Living people
Indian National Lok Dal politicians
Bharatiya Janata Party politicians from Haryana
People from Palwal district
Year of birth missing (living people)
Haryana MLAs 2014–2019